The Embassy of Sweden in Rome is Sweden's diplomatic mission in Italy. The current building was built between 1965-1966 and completed in 1967.

History
The Swedish Legation in Rome has very old roots. Already in the 1400s, Sweden dispatched a delegate to protect Swedish interests at the Roman Curia, the highest administrative body of the Roman Catholic Church. Today, the Embassy of Sweden covers Italy and the cross-accredited country of San Marino. The embassy is also responsible for Sweden's relations with the UN bodies based in Rome – Food and Agriculture Organization (FAO), World Food Programme (WFP) and International Fund for Agricultural Development (IFAD).

Buildings

Chancery
In the 1910s and the early 1920s, the chancery building was located at Palazzo Capranica via Teatro Valle 16 in Rome. In early 1920s, it moved to Via di Villa Patrizi 3. By the 1930s, it had moved to Viale del Policlinico 131. By the 1940s, the address was once again Via di Villa Patrizi 3. In the mid-1940s, the chancery moved to Viale Michele Bianchi 12 GA and Via di Villa Patrizi 3 became the ambassadorial residence. In the late 1940s, the chancery moved back to Viale Policlinico, but now to number 129 A.

The building that now houses the Embassy of Sweden is located at Piazza Rio de Janeiro 3 and was designed in the years 1965–66 and completed in 1967. In April 1977, Sweden purchased the property from the Pontifical Institute for Foreign Missions (PIME) through the National Property Board of Sweden's predecessor the National Board of Public Building (Byggnadsstyrelsen). PIME, an organisation that dates back over 150 years, also owned the villa that previously stood on the same plot. Not far from Villa Borghese lies the Piazza Rio de Janeiro in north-east Rome. With its modernist facade, the property stands apart from the surrounding buildings in the area, which are older and more classical in nature.

Residence
Via di Villa Patrizi 3, which was used as chancery on and off since the 1920s, became the ambassadorial residence in the mid-1940s. In the late 1940s, the residence moved to another house on the same street, Via di Villa Patrizi 5.

The property is 1,500 square meters and is set in a well-kept green, sparkling garden surrounded by tall walls and stately gates. The Swedish state bought the property on 18 April 1922. In connection with the purchase, architect Ragnar Hjort was commissioned to draw up documents for redevelopment, and his proposal was then not implemented. The building has been renovated and rebuilt several times. Among other things, a garage, a new entrance and a greenhouse have been added. In 2008–2009, the National Property Board of Sweden carried out a project that attempted to return to a more authentic plaster facade. The new plaster facade now blends into the surrounding buildings.

Heads of Mission

References

External links
 Embassy of Sweden in Rome

Rome
Italy–Sweden relations
Sweden